Nippoptilia is a genus of moths in the family Pterophoridae. The genus was erected by Shōnen Matsumura in 1931.

Species
Nippoptilia cinctipedalis (Walker, 1864)
Nippoptilia distigmata S. Kim & B. K. Byun, 2010
Nippoptilia issikii Yano, 1961
Nippoptilia philippensis Gielis, 2003
Nippoptilia pullum Gielis & De Vos, 2006
Nippoptilia regulus (Meyrick, 1906)
Nippoptilia rutteni Gielis, 2003
Nippoptilia spinosa Yano, 1963
Nippoptilia vitis (Sasaki, 1913)

References
Arensberger, E. (2010). "Stichprobenartige Untersuchungen der Fauna Thailands (Lepidoptera: Pterophoridae)". Zeitschrift der Arbeitsgemeinschaft Österreich Entomologen. (62): 1-16. 

Platyptiliini
Moth genera
Taxa named by Shōnen Matsumura